Penelope is a 1966 comedy and caper film directed by Arthur Hiller, and starring Natalie Wood, Ian Bannen, Peter Falk, Jonathan Winters, and Dick Shawn. George Wells' screenplay was based on the 1965 novel of the same title, written by Howard Melvin Fast under the pseudonym E.V. Cunningham.

Plot
Penelope Elcott (Natalie Wood) is the wife of wealthy banker James Elcott (Ian Bannen). Penelope decides to disguise herself as an old woman and rob her husband's bank. While the police, including Lieutenant Horatio Bixbee (Peter Falk), rush to get to the bank, Penelope escapes in a red wig and yellow suit. She donates some of the stolen money to a Salvation Army worker and donates the suit to a second-hand thrift shop. Con artists Sabada (Lila Kedrova) and Ducky (Lou Jacobi) immediately recognize the suit as an original designer outfit from Paris, and purchase it for a mere $7.

Penelope visits her psychiatrist Gregory (Dick Shawn) and tells him all about her criminal activities. She says it began in college when a professor (Jonathan Winters) lured her into his laboratory and attempted to rape her, but she escaped, leaving her dress ripped off in the process. During the chase, she stole the watch fob of the professor. She next stole on her wedding day. When she caught her maid of honor Mildred Halliday (Norma Crane) kissing James, she swiped Mildred's earrings and necklace. Gregory suggests she is stealing to attract attention from her distant husband.

A young woman, Honeysuckle Rose, is accused of being the thief. Gregory wants to return the stolen money to the bank, but panics when he hears police cars arriving. Penelope confesses and tries to clear the innocent Honeysuckle, but Horatio the cop and husband James do not believe her. Ducky and Sabada pay a visit, trying to blackmail her, but Penelope foils their blackmail attempt.

Penelope hosts a dinner party, having stolen from all the invited guests. She tries to return the stolen items, but all claim that they never have seen them before. Penelope, confused and frightened, runs away. She again robs James' bank, but unlike the previous time, she is crying. James begs Horatio to find her. Penelope goes to Horatio with the stolen money, but the cop knows James would not press charges against his own wife.

The psychiatrist explains the dinner guests denied recognizing the stolen items because they would lose the fraudulently inflated insurance claims they collected. Gregory breaks down and begs Penelope to run away with him. She refuses, telling him she is cured. James realizes that he has neglected Penelope and starts seeing her face everywhere he turns. He goes to the psychiatrist's office, where James and Penelope happily reunite.

Cast
 Natalie Wood as Penelope Elcott
 Ian Bannen as James B. Elcott
 Dick Shawn as Dr. Gregory Mannix
 Peter Falk as Lieutenant Horatio Bixbee
 Lila Kedrova as Princess Sadaba
 Lou Jacobi as Ducky
 Jonathan Winters as Professor Klobb
 Norma Crane as Mildred Halliday
 Arthur Malet as Salvation Army Major Higgins
 Jerome Cowan as Bank Manager
 Arlene Golonka as Honeysuckle Rose
 Amzie Strickland as Miss Serena
 Bill Gunn as Sergeant Rothschild
 Carl Ballantine as Boom Boom
 Iggie Wolfington as Store Owner

Production
The novel was published in 1965. The Los Angeles Times called it "that rare addition to whodunnit fiction, an original and unusual plot told with wit and intelligence".

Edith Head provided Wood with a $250,000 wardrobe for the film.

Filming started in New York in May 1966.

Wood later said making the film was difficult for her. "I broke out in hives and suffered anguish that was very real pain every day we shot", she recalled. "Arthur Hiller, the director, kept saying, 'Natalie, I think you're resisting this film', while I rolled around the floor in agony."

Reception
The film was a box-office disappointment. Wood did not make another movie for three years. Film critic Leonard Maltin dismissed the film as "this quite unfunny comedy", awarding it 1½ of 4 stars.

See also
 List of American films of 1966

References

External links

 
 
 
 

1960s crime comedy films
1966 films
American crime comedy films
Films scored by John Williams
Films about bank robbery
Films directed by Arthur Hiller
Films set in New York City
Films shot in New York City
Metro-Goldwyn-Mayer films
Films with screenplays by George Wells
1966 comedy films
1960s English-language films
1960s American films